The CTV Television Network, commonly known as CTV, is a Canadian English-language terrestrial television network. Launched in 1961 and acquired by BCE Inc. in 2000, CTV is Canada's largest privately owned television network and is now a division of the Bell Media subsidiary of BCE. It is Canada's largest privately or commercially owned network consisting of 22 owned-and-operated stations nationwide and two privately owned affiliates, and has consistently been placed as Canada's top-rated network in total viewers and in key demographics since 2002, after several years trailing the rival Global Television Network in key markets.

Bell Media also operates additional CTV-branded properties, including the 24-hour national cable news network CTV News Channel and the secondary CTV Two television system.

There has never been an official full name corresponding to the initials "CTV"; prior to CTV's launch in 1961, it was given the proposed branding of "Canadian Television Network" (CTN). But that branding was dropped before the network's launch when the Canadian Broadcasting Corporation (CBC) objected to it, claiming exclusive rights to the term "Canadian".

History

Formation
In 1958, Prime Minister John Diefenbaker's government passed the Broadcasting Act, which established the Board of Broadcast Governors (BBG), a forerunner to the Canadian Radio-television and Telecommunications Commission (CRTC), as the governing body of Canadian broadcasting, effectively ending the Canadian Broadcasting Corporation's (CBC) dual role as regulator and broadcaster. The new board's first act was to take applications for "second" television stations in Halifax, Montreal (in both English and French), Ottawa, Toronto, Winnipeg, Calgary, Edmonton, and Vancouver in response to an outcry for an alternative to the CBC's television service. Calgary and Edmonton were served by privately owned CBC affiliates; the other six markets by CBC owned-and-operated stations (O&Os).

The nine winners, in order of their first sign-on, were:
CFCN-TV Calgary (September 9, 1960)
CHAN-TV Vancouver (October 31, 1960)
CJAY-TV Winnipeg (November 12, 1960)
CFTO-TV Toronto (December 31, 1960)
CJCH-TV Halifax (January 1, 1961)
CFCF-TV Montreal (English; January 20, 1961)
CFTM-TV Montreal (French; February 19, 1961)
CJOH-TV Ottawa (March 12, 1961)
CBXT Edmonton (October 1, 1961)

The first eight stations were privately owned; the Edmonton station was a CBC O&O, thus CFRN-TV, the existing local station, would lose its CBC affiliation once CBXT signed on.

Even before his station was licensed, John Bassett, the chief executive of the ultimately successful Toronto applicant Baton Aldred Rogers Broadcasting, had expressed interest in participating in the creation of a second television network, "of which we see the Toronto station as anchor". Indeed, Baton had already begun quietly contacting the successful applicants in other cities to gauge their interest in forming a cooperative group to share Canadian programming among the stations. This led to the July 1960 formation of the Independent Television Organization (ITO), consisting of the eight newly licensed private stations and CFRN, each having one vote in the ITO's operations regardless of the size of its audience (CFTM, being a French-language station and therefore having little reason to collaborate with the other stations, would soon withdraw from the group; it would later emerge as the flagship of the first private French-language network, TVA). The ITO soon resolved to apply for a network licence to link these second stations.

However, the ITO faced opposition from Spence Caldwell, a former CBC executive and one of the unsuccessful applicants for the Toronto licence, who had first approached the BBG in April 1960 to pitch a second-station network proposal of his own. Under his plan, at least 51% of the shares of the network would be owned by various prominent Bay Street investors who had previously backed his Toronto station bid; only 49% would be reserved for the network's affiliates to purchase, if they wished. The BBG – and particularly its chair Andrew Stewart (who at the time also served as the president of the University of Alberta) – was not in favour of a station-owned network, fearing that any such network would be dominated by Toronto's CFTO. Although it did not immediately approve Caldwell's proposal, it soon set several conditions on such a network that effectively made Caldwell's group the only feasible applicant.

That fall, the Caldwell group (now named the Canadian Television Network, or CTN) and the ITO faced off in a series of meetings with the BBG. The ITO decided not to follow through with a formal network application, but the stations – particularly Baton, which said it had no interest in participating in CTN and believed it could still be successful without one – continued to indicate various concerns with the viability of Caldwell's proposal. Ultimately, the BBG granted a licence to CTN, conditional on securing the affiliation of six of the eight ITO stations.

Baton's opposition to the CTN reversed in early 1961, soon after CFTO won the broadcast rights to the Canadian Football League Eastern Conference for the 1961 and 1962 seasons. Baton's original plan was to operate a temporary network to distribute the games incorporating CFTO, other independent stations, and CBC affiliates in smaller markets (assuming the public network released its affiliates to carry the game). Although the plan was neither officially rejected or approved, various uncertainties eventually led John Bassett to decide to sign an affiliation agreement with CTN instead to ensure the games would air. Most of the other second stations followed suit, with the exception of CHAN in Vancouver, which agreed to carry several network programs but never officially signed on as an affiliate for the duration of the Caldwell era, yet nonetheless would later claim to have been a "charter member" of the network.

Early years
The network finally launched as the CTV Television Network on October 1, 1961. The CBC had objected to the network's initial name, apparently claiming it had exclusive rights to the term "Canadian", and therefore the letters "CTV" have no official expanded meaning.

The CTV network's first night on-air began with Harry Rasky's promotional documentary on the new network. That was followed by a fall season preview program.

CTV's initial 1961–1962 season began with the following programs, five of which were Canadian productions:
 The Andy Griffith Show (United States, CBS)
 Checkmate (United States, CBS)
 Cross Canada Barndance (Canada)
 Maigret (United Kingdom, BBC)
 The Rifleman (United States, ABC)
 Showdown (Canada)
 Sing Along With Mitch (United States, NBC)
 Take a Chance, a quiz show by Roy Ward Dickson adapted from radio (Canada)
 Top Cat (United States, ABC)
 Twenty Questions (Canada)
 West Coast (Canada)
 Whiplash (Australia, ATN-7)

Other series such as Telepoll and A Kin to Win were introduced later in the inaugural season.

At first, flagship CFTO was the only station that carried programming live. During CBC's off-hours, CTV used CBC's microwave system to send programming to the rest of the country on tape delay. Eventually, a second microwave channel opened up, enabling live programming from coast to coast.

The Caldwell-led management team immediately ran into financial trouble, and relations between the network and its stations were not smooth at first since CTV had essentially been the product of a forced marriage. For example, most of the rights to American programming rested with the ITO, not CTV. In many cases, CTV found itself competing with its own stations for the rights to programming.

Reorganization and expansion
Caldwell's departure in 1965 did little to alleviate the situation, and CTV soon found itself on the verge of bankruptcy. In 1966, the network's affiliates (which by this time included CJON-TV in St. John's, CKCO-TV in Kitchener, CHAB/CHRE in Moose Jaw/Regina, and the network's first and only U.S. affiliate, WNYP-TV in Jamestown, New York) sought permission to buy the network and run it as a cooperative. The BBG was initially skeptical of the proposal. Since CFTO was by far the largest and richest station (it was more than double the size of the next-largest station, Montreal's CFCF-TV), the BBG feared that CFTO would dominate CTV if the stations were allowed to buy the network. To alleviate these concerns, the affiliates promised that each station owner would have one vote regardless of its audience share.  The board readily approved the proposal, and by the start of the 1966–67 season, the stations owned their network. The network also began broadcasting in colour on September 1, 1966.

By the mid-1970s, CTV had expanded its footprint across Canada, mostly by twinstick arrangements in smaller cities, and with CBC affiliates switching to CTV once the CBC opened its own stations or added rebroadcasters of nearby O&O stations. In a unique twist, the original Saskatchewan affiliate, CHAB/CHRE, was bought by the CBC in 1969 (and eventually changed its calls to CBKT, with the Regina station as the main station), allowing Regina's original station, CKCK-TV, to join CTV. Its attempt to expand to the United States ended when Buffalo's three network affiliates threatened legal action, forcing WNYP off the air.

CTV made a name for itself in news coverage when it convinced star CBC news anchor Lloyd Robertson to switch networks in 1976. (Robertson served as the network's main anchorman until 2011). Its weekly newsmagazine series, W5, has been a fixture on the network since 1966, predating the similar American program 60 Minutes by two years.

In the 1970s, CTV often bought rights to pop and rock songs to serve as theme music for its programming, rather than commissioning original themes. Most notably, W5 used an instrumental portion of Supertramp's "Fool's Overture", Canada AM used an instrumental version of The Moody Blues' "Ride My See-Saw", the game show Definition used Quincy Jones' "Soul Bossa Nova" and the CTV Movie used the Keith Mansfield instrumental "Statement" from the KPM Musichouse library.

For most of its first four decades, CTV did not have what could be considered a main schedule outside of news programming.  The differences were enough that Ottawa's CJOH used a rebroadcaster in Cornwall to feed cable systems in Montreal from the early 1980s through the mid-1990s despite the presence of CFCF; the CJOH rebroadcaster reaches the western portion of the Montreal area.

Conflict and consolidation
CTV's cooperative structure regularly led to conflicts between the network's owner-affiliates. In particular, the owners of CFCF, CJOH, and especially CHAN felt that Baton Broadcasting, owners of flagship CFTO in Toronto, dominated production of network programming.

In the mid-1980s, Baton began a drive to take over CTV by buying as many affiliates as possible. Having already bought CFQC-TV in Saskatoon in 1971, Baton purchased additional stations in Saskatchewan – including CTV affiliates CKCK-TV Regina, CICC-TV Yorkton, and CIPA-TV Prince Albert – in 1986. Baton then purchased CJOH in 1988, followed by the MCTV and Huron Broadcasting stations, which included four CTV affiliates in Northern Ontario, in 1990.

One caveat, however, was the "one owner, one vote" provision of the cooperative's bylaws. Any acquisition of one station by an existing station owner triggered an automatic redistribution of the acquired station's shares among the other owners. As a result, even though it owned 11 of CTV's 24 affiliates, Baton still had only had one vote out of eight.

Around the same time, several CTV owner-affiliates were expanding their holdings outside of the network. CHAN owner Western International Communications purchased Selkirk Communications and Allarcom, which together owned several independent stations in Alberta and Ontario. CHUM Limited, owner of the CTV-affiliated ATV system serving the Maritimes, already owned independent station CITY-TV in Toronto, and by this point had begun launching national cable channels like MuchMusic. Even Baton added some stations outside of CTV, with the purchase or launch of three independent stations in southwestern Ontario in 1992–93. It also began competing with the network for some program acquisitions in 1992, and in 1994 launched the Baton Broadcast System (BBS) as a parallel programming brand for both its CTV affiliates and independent stations.

After several years of contentious negotiations between the eight remaining owner-affiliates, by late 1992 they had reached an agreement to recapitalize the network, and provide a path for a single company to eventually take control. The restructuring took effect in January 1993, and CTV converted from a cooperative to a corporation. Seven of the owner-affiliates invested equally, yielding a 14.3% stake in the network for each; however, Newfoundland Broadcasting, owner of CJON, decided not to invest further and effectively relinquished its vote, reducing the number of active voting members to seven. As part of the restructuring, the stations also agreed to reduce the number of hours of network programming, allowing Baton and WIC to program more of their stations’ schedules with their own acquisitions.

In 1996, Baton acquired CFCN from Rogers Communications. Significantly, Baton also acquired Rogers' CTV vote. It also started a joint venture with Electrohome, owner of CFRN and CKCO. As part of the deal, Baton was allowed to vote Electrohome's shares in addition to its own. The following year, Baton acquired Electrohome's share of the joint venture, and separately acquired ATV from CHUM. This gave Baton a 57.2% controlling interest in the network, triggering a put option allowing the remaining affiliates, WIC (which by this time owned both CHAN and CFCF) and Moffat (owner of CKY), to sell their CTV shares to Baton without selling their stations, which they did. Baton was now full owner of the CTV network and immediately began plastering the CTV brand across its stations, even on non-network programming, and dropped its secondary BBS brand. The company changed its name to CTV Inc. in 1998, and eventually acquired two of the final three large-market stations, CKY and CFCF (it replaced the third, CHAN, as discussed below).

CTV has attracted some controversy in the past because of cutbacks to its small-market stations. In the late 1990s, cuts were made to the news staff and productions at CTV's two small-market Saskatchewan stations, CICC-TV in Yorkton and CIPA-TV in Prince Albert. These stations currently simulcast supper-hour and late-night news from CKCK and CFQC respectively, placing local inserts into the newscasts. Similarly, the four Maritime stations, known collectively as CTV Atlantic (then known as ATV), and the four Northern Ontario stations, known collectively as CTV Northern Ontario (then known as MCTV), each had their local news production cut back in the early 2000s to one single centrally produced newscast for each region, with only brief inserts for news of strictly local interest. This was a controversial move in all of the affected communities, especially in Northern Ontario where MCTV's newscasts were the only locally oriented news programs in those markets.

Bell Canada era

In 2000, typical of the ownership consolidation trend at the time, BCE Inc. acquired CTV, Netstar Communications, and The Globe and Mail newspaper, combining them into a media division known as Bell Globemedia (BGM). BGM also subsequently acquired a minority share in the French-language network TQS, which broadcasts in Quebec.

CTV has legally been a "television service" in the eyes of the CRTC since 2000, when it allowed its network licence to expire. CBC, Radio-Canada, TVA and Aboriginal Peoples Television Network are the only official television networks in Canada (CTV was issued a separate network licence in 2001 to continue to provide programming to CHFD Thunder Bay, CJBN Kenora, and CITL Lloydminster).

CTV lost significant coverage in British Columbia and Newfoundland and Labrador at the beginning of the 21st century, starting with a major television realignment in Vancouver. In 2000, Canwest Global bought the television stations of Western International Communications, which owned long-standing CTV affiliates CHAN in Vancouver and CHEK-TV in Victoria. A year later, after its CTV contract ran out, Canwest made CHAN the Global owned-and-operated station for British Columbia, taking advantage of CHAN's massive network of repeaters that cover 97% of the province. CTV shifted its programming to CIVT-TV, an independent station it already owned. Unlike CHAN, CIVT has only one transmitter covering the metropolitan areas of Vancouver and Victoria, and has to rely on cable and satellite to reach the rest of the province. CIVT is either carried on a higher channel number or unavailable altogether in the Mountain Time Zone portion of British Columbia, where CTV relies on CFCN-DT or CFRN-DT as its main carriers.

Meanwhile, in 2002, CJON-TV (known as "NTV") in St. John's dropped its 38-year CTV affiliation after the network attempted to alter its affiliation agreement in a way that Newfoundland Broadcasting found unfair. Since joining CTV, CJON had aired the base network schedule essentially for free since CTV paid it for the airtime. The station then bought additional CTV programming and sold all advertising. However, CTV tried to make CJON pay for the base schedule as well, with no possibility of airtime payments. It also increased the fees for additional CTV programming beyond what CJON claimed it could pay. Newfoundland Broadcasting also did not want to continue to carry CTV's national advertising during these programs. At the start of the 2002–03 season, CJON became an independent station and dropped most CTV programming except for national newscasts; in exchange, it provides news coverage of Newfoundland and Labrador events to CTV. In recent years, all of CTV's non-news programming has disappeared from the station, and since then virtually all primetime programs aired on that station are from rival Global. CTV does not currently have a de facto affiliate in that province, with most Newfoundlanders having to rely on cable and satellite (usually from CTV Atlantic) for its programming.

In September 2005, CTV announced an agreement with MTV Networks that saw the launch of MTV Canada.

In July 2006, CTV parent Bell Globemedia announced plans to acquire CHUM Limited, itself a former partner in CTV (via ATV), and at that point one of Canada's largest broadcasters. While CTVglobemedia kept CHUM's radio stations along with the A-Channel television stations and most of CHUM's specialty channels, the Citytv stations were sold off to Rogers as required by the conditions the CRTC placed upon CTV when approving the CHUM purchase. Bell Globemedia was renamed CTVglobemedia on January 1, 2007. In March 2009, CTV became the first Canadian television network to offer its programming online in high definition.

CTV affiliate CHFD in Thunder Bay, Ontario left the network on February 12, 2010, after being unable to reach an agreement on new affiliation terms; CHFD instead became a full-time Global affiliate. CFTO was offered as part of the basic package to Thunder Bay cable subscribers for the duration of the 2010 Winter Olympics; the station had otherwise been available only on the digital cable timeshifting package, leaving CTV without a presence on basic cable in the market.

On September 10, 2010, BCE Inc. announced it would purchase the remaining shares of CTVglobemedia for $1.3 billion (CAD). On April 1, 2011, CTVglobemedia was officially renamed Bell Media. On December 1, 2011, CJBN-TV in Kenora, Ontario dropped all CTV programming and became a full Global station, adopting a schedule similar to nearby Global station CKND-DT in Winnipeg. The move left CITL-DT in Lloydminster as the sole remaining CTV affiliate not owned by the network until 2014. It was announced in June 2014, that CKPR-DT in Thunder Bay, Ontario would change affiliations from CBC to CTV on September 1, 2014, resulting in Thunder Bay having a CTV affiliate again.

On May 20, 2015, Corus Entertainment announced an agreement with Bell Media to switch its three CBC affiliates in Ontario to CTV: CHEX-DT Peterborough, CHEX-TV-2 Oshawa, and CKWS-DT Kingston. The affiliation switch went into effect on August 31, 2015.

Programming

The network's programming consists mainly of hit American series (such as The Amazing Race, The Big Bang Theory, Blue Bloods, Castle, CSI, The Good Doctor,  Grey's Anatomy, The Mentalist, The Michael J. Fox Show,  Unforgettable and The X Factor), but it has also had success with Canadian-made shows such as Due South, Power Play, Degrassi: The Next Generation, Corner Gas, Instant Star, The Eleventh Hour, Flashpoint, The Listener, Canadian Idol, MasterChef Canada and The Amazing Race Canada.

CTV also regularly produces and airs Canadian-made television movies, often based on stories from Canadian news or Canadian history, under the banners CTV Signature Series or CTV Movie.

News programming consists of the nightly CTV National News; national morning program Your Morning on CTV stations in Eastern Canada; local morning program CTV Morning Live on CTV stations in Western Canada; local newscasts branded as CTV News; and newsmagazines W-Five and Question Period, which interviews politicians and recaps political events during the week.

As well, in recent years, CTV has purchased Canadian broadcast rights to a number of American cable series, such as The Sopranos, Nip/Tuck, Punk'd, The Daily Show, The Colbert Report, and The Osbournes. In many cases, CTV has been one of the few conventional broadcast networks in the world to air these series in prime time, which has attracted some controversy from Canadian media watchdogs and parents groups who object to the profanity, violence and sexual content of Nip/Tuck, The Sopranos and The Osbournes—which, unlike originating broadcaster MTV, CTV aired uncensored. It has broadcast MTV programming live, starting with the MTV's New Year of Music special during New Year's 2005/2006.

In late 2003, CTV started broadcasting select American programmes in 16:9 (widescreen) high definition. It later began airing Canadian programs in this format, such as Degrassi. Currently, only CFTO and CIVT have dedicated HD feeds (sometimes marketed as CTV HD East and West respectively), but both are available nationally via cable and satellite, and do not differ otherwise from their analog counterparts.

On July 2, 2005, CTV broadcast 20 hours of the Live 8 concerts, which was watched by over 10.5 million people – nearly one-third the country's population – at some point during the day; however, the average audience was much lower. According to at least one source, it was the most-watched program by this standard in Canadian history.

On June 27, 2007, CTV and The Comedy Network gained exclusive Canadian rights to the entire Comedy Central library of past and current programs on all electronic platforms, under a multi-year agreement with Viacom, expanding on past programming agreements between the two channels. Canadian users attempting to visit Comedy Central websites are redirected to The Comedy Network's website, and vice versa for American users. The Canadian channel kept its own brand name, but the agreement is otherwise very similar to the earlier CTV/Viacom deal for MTV Canada.

Sports programming

Historically, CTV Sports existed as a stand-alone division; with CTV's purchase of cable network TSN in 2001, TSN has assumed responsibility for all sports output on CTV since.

In early 2005, CTV was part of the consortium that won the Canadian broadcast rights to Vancouver 2010 Winter Olympics hosted by Canada itself and the London 2012 Summer Olympics. CBC had consistently won Olympic broadcast rights from the 1996 Summer Olympics through to the 2008 Summer Olympics, the 1996 Summer Olympics being held in their main fiction TV series source, the United States. CTV and V (now Noovo and previously TQS) were the primary broadcasters, with TSN, RDS and Sportsnet providing supplementary coverage. CTV promised to broadcast 22 hours per day of event coverage during the 2012 Olympics; regular CTV programming was reallocated to CTV's secondary television system CTV Two during the Olympics.

On May 22, 2007, it was announced that CTV had acquired the broadcast rights to the National Football League early-afternoon Sunday games, the full NFL playoffs, and the Super Bowl, starting with the 2007 NFL season, effectively ending a lengthy association between the NFL and Global. TSN, a sports channel co-owned with CTV, airs primetime NFL games and produces the CTV broadcasts in tandem with CBS and Fox.

CTV high-definition and digital transition

CTV carries its high-definition feed broadcasting at 1080i. The following CTV stations are available in HD on digital terrestrial television (DTT):

On November 19, 2003, CTV launched an HD simulcast of its Toronto station CFTO-DT, with the free-to-air feed launching in 2005. CTV has since launched HD simulcasts of CIVT-DT Vancouver on June 1, 2004 (the terrestrial feed followed suit in 2006), CFCN-DT Calgary on January 8, 2009, CFCF-DT Montreal on December 1, 2009 (the free-to-air feed followed suit on January 28, 2011), CJOH-DT Ottawa on December 1, 2009 (BDU only), CFRN-DT Edmonton in January 2011, CKY-DT Winnipeg in February 2011, and CJCH-DT Halifax on May 11, 2011.

Local newscasts in high definition
On May 12, 2009, Toronto's CFTO-DT became the first station in the CTV network to broadcast its local newscasts in high definition (the first station in Canada to broadcast its local newscasts in high definition was fellow Toronto station CITY-DT). CTV-owned CIVT-DT in Vancouver followed, becoming the second station in the CTV network to broadcast its local newscasts in high definition as of November 23, 2009. CFCN-DT in Calgary began broadcasting its local newscasts in HD in October 2011, while CFRN-DT in Edmonton upgraded its local news production to HD in October 2012.

CTV stations

CTV owned-and-operated stations 
As of mid-October 2005, all CTV-owned and operated stations have adopted a single on-air brand of "CTV", rather than use their official callsigns or channel numbers on-air (although some stations, most notably CIVT, promote their cable channel number). When further differentiation is needed, for example during regional programming, the city or region they serve (for example, "CTV Ottawa" or "CTV British Columbia") may be used as well. Under CRTC regulations, however, the callsign is still the station's legal name.

Note:
1) Italicized channel numbers indicate a digital channel allocated for future use by the Canadian Radio-television and Telecommunications Commission.

Regional affiliates 
As CTV does not presently operate as a de jure television network using a CRTC-issued network license, these stations acquire CTV programming from Bell Media by way of program supply agreements, not network affiliation agreements. Although they currently carry the vast majority of CTV programs and generally use a similar schedule to CTV-owned stations, the stations retain all advertising inventory, and have final authority over carriage and scheduling of CTV programming.

Former affiliates

Special cases 
 St. John's, Newfoundland and Labrador – CJON-DT (NTV): disaffiliated with CTV in 2002, but still carries CTV's newscasts and specials.

Other CTV-branded channels

In addition to CTV News Channel, several other spin-offs have been launched under the CTV branding. 
Former specialty channels that have used the CTV brand (and formerly had ownership stakes by the parent company) include CTV Sportsnet (now Sportsnet) and CTV Travel (now T+E).

Following the 2007 acquisition of A-Channel by CTVglobemedia as part of the takeover of CHUM Limited, media analysts had speculated that CTV may potentially extend its market-leading CTV brand to that television network. Bell officially announced on May 30, 2011, that the A-Channel television network would be rebranded as "CTV Two", a change that took effect on August 29, 2011. CTV Two currently consists of four over-the-air O&Os in Ontario and three in British Columbia, as well as regional cable-only channels in Atlantic Canada and Alberta, providing complementary programming which have smaller audiences than those on the mainline CTV network.

In June 2018, Bell Media announced plans to rename four of its existing specialty channels under the CTV branding. Bravo, The Comedy Network, Gusto, and Space were respectively relaunched as CTV Drama Channel, CTV Comedy Channel, CTV Life Channel, and CTV Sci-Fi Channel on September 12, 2019. In December 2018, Bell launched two ad-supported video on demand (AVOD) services, CTV Movies and CTV Throwback (originally announced as "CTV Vault"), respectively offering second-run feature films and classic TV series. Their programming comes from an agreement with Sony Pictures Television; Sony's video service, Crackle, would exit Canada on June 28, 2018, with its content being assumed by the two services. 

It was also announced that content from CTV, its four genre channels, as well as CTV Movies and CTV Throwback, would be eventually accessible within a unified "super-hub" for streaming video platforms. The new CTV app was released in July 2020, subsuming the TV Everywhere apps for the aforementioned channels. It would also subsume the streaming apps for most other Bell Media networks.

Logos
The network's original logo was an oval-shaped letter "C", the inside shaped like a television tube. Contained within the C were the initials "CTV". In 1966, colour programming was ushered in with a new logo, depicting a red circle containing the initial "C", a blue square with a "T", and a green inverted triangle with a "V". This logo has been used, albeit with minor variations along the way ever since. In 1967, the letters "CTV" were rounded and easier to see, with the "base/TV" graphic added later. In 1975, the shapes were brightened.

In 1990, the letters "CTV" were angled and tweaked with any additional designs dropped from it. In 1998, CTV introduced a new "ribbons" identity which lasted until 2018 with various minor adjustments before then. Initially, CTV used the three coloured ribbons and shapes of its logo to represent its different divisions. In the network branding, the red ribbon and circle represented entertainment programming, the blue ribbon and square represented news programming, and the green ribbon and inverted triangle referred to sports programming. For a period, the identity featured bumper idents featuring CTV personalities manipulating the logo's shapes as physical objects. In 2004, the network added colour gradients to the shapes to create a 3D effect. The 3D shapes were then brightened in 2011.

On September 24, 2018, CTV introduced a new logo and branding elements with a flatter "digital" appearance, as well as a new promotional campaign, "Get into it".

See also
 List of CTV personalities
 Television in Canada
 Media in Canada
 Simultaneous substitution

Footnotes

References

Bibliography

External links
 
 CTV News
 History of CTV Television Network – Canadian Communications Foundation
 Broadcasting Decision CRTC 2011-444, Bell Media Inc. – Group-based licence renewals, CRTC, July 27, 2011

 
1961 establishments in Canada
Former cooperatives of Canada
Television channels and stations established in 1961
Companies acquired by Bell Canada Enterprises
Companies based in Toronto